Valery Rachkov (born 24 April 1956) is a Kazakhstani boxer. He competed in the men's welterweight event at the 1976 Summer Olympics as a member of the Soviet Union. At the 1976 Summer Olympics, he defeated Martti Marjamaa and David Jackson, before losing to Jochen Bachfield.

References

External links
 

1956 births
Living people
Kazakhstani male boxers
Olympic boxers of the Soviet Union
Boxers at the 1976 Summer Olympics
Sportspeople from Almaty
AIBA World Boxing Championships medalists
Welterweight boxers